Jan Plas (16 March 19451 September 2010) was a Dutch professional kickboxer, trainer and founder of the Mejiro Gym in Amsterdam. He is considered to be the father of kickboxing in the Netherlands.

Career
Plas began his career in martial arts in karate, learning Kyokushin from Jon Bluming. He founded the Mejiro Gym in 1978 after learning kickboxing from Kenji Kurosaki, a Japanese martial artist who founded the original Mejiro Gym in Mejiro, Tokyo. In 1976, he founded the NKBB (The Dutch Kickboxing Association) with Thom Harinck. He also went on to run the Vos Gym and trained many world-class fighters including Peter Aerts, Lucien Carbin, Ivan Hippolyte, Rob Kaman, Andre Mannaart and Fred Royers.

Plas was also a member of the Dutch organized crime world. In 1986, he was involved in the kidnapping of Gijs van Dam II, the son of hash dealer Gijs van Dam, with a gang run by the drug lord Johan Verhoek, also known as "De Hakkelaar". In April 2008, Plas was arrested on suspicion of drug trafficking and his daughter and son-in-law, both police officers in Amsterdam, were charged with fraud and money laundering.

On September 1, 2010, it was reported that Plas had committed suicide in his jail cell at the age of 65.

References

1945 births
2010 suicides
Dutch male karateka
Dutch male kickboxers
Kickboxing trainers
Kyokushin kaikan practitioners
Martial arts school founders
Bodyguards
Dutch gangsters
Dutch drug traffickers
20th-century Dutch criminals
21st-century Dutch criminals
Sportspeople from Amsterdam
Suicides in the Netherlands
People who committed suicide in prison custody
Dutch people who died in prison custody
20th-century philanthropists
2010 deaths
Criminals from Amsterdam